This article contains a list of the most studied restriction enzymes whose names start with L to N inclusive. It contains approximately 120 enzymes.

The following information is given:



Whole list navigation

Restriction enzymes

L

M

N

Notes

Biotechnology
Restriction enzyme cutting sites
Restriction enzymes